John C. McCaherty (born April 6, 1965) is an American politician. He was a member of the Missouri House of Representatives, from 2011 to September 16, 2017. He is a member of the Republican Party.

McCaherty announced his resignation on September 16, 2017, so he could run for (Jefferson County) executive in November 2018.

References

Living people
Republican Party members of the Missouri House of Representatives
1965 births
21st-century American politicians
People from Columbus, Mississippi
People from High Ridge, Missouri